Scutus rueppelli is a species of sea snail, a marine gastropod mollusk in the family Fissurellidae, the keyhole limpets and slit limpets.

Original spelling Rüppeli, with reference to "Rüppel et Leuck. Atlas 1828", thus indicating that the specific epithet is named after Eduard Rüppell (1794-1884).

Distribution
This marine species occurs in the Red Sea.

References

 Zuschin, Janssen, Baal - Gastropods and their habitats from the northern red Sea, Part I Patellogastropoda, Vetigastropoda, Cycloneritimorpha.pdf Ann. Naturhist. Mus. Wien 111 A  73-158, Wien April 2009

External links
 To Encyclopedia of Life
 To World Register of Marine Species

Fissurellidae
Gastropods described in 1851